A partial lunar eclipse will take place on November 8, 2041.

Visibility

Related lunar eclipses

Lunar year series (354 days)

Metonic series
This eclipse is the fourth of five Metonic cycle lunar eclipses on the same date, November 8–9, each separated by 19 years.

See also
List of lunar eclipses and List of 21st-century lunar eclipses

Notes

External links

2041-11
2041-11
2041 in science